Aq Bolagh-e Chang Almas (also Romanized as Āq Bolāgh-e Chang Almās; also known as Āghbolāgh, Aghbolagh Gavbazeh, Āq Bolāgh-e Chang Almāsī, Aq Bolāq-e Chang Almās, and Āq Bulāq Changal Almās) is a village in Pir Taj Rural District, Chang Almas District, Bijar County, Kurdistan Province, Iran. At the 2006 census, its population was 181, in 45 families. The village is populated by Azerbaijanis.

References 

Towns and villages in Bijar County
Azerbaijani settlements in Kurdistan Province